The 1962 East Carolina Pirates football team represented East Carolina College—now known as East Carolina University—during the 1962 NCAA College Division football season.

Schedule

References

East Carolina Pirates
East Carolina Pirates football seasons
East Carolina Pirates f